is a small near-Earth object, approximately  in diameter, that transited Earth at 8 lunar distances on 18 December 2017 at 14:54 UTC. The Apollo asteroid on an eccentric orbit was first observed by the Mount Lemmon Survey and was lost on the following night. , it has not been recovered.

Description
 was first observed on 15 December 2017, by astronomers of the Mount Lemmon Survey at Mount Lemmon Observatory near Tucson, Arizona.

It orbits the Sun at a distance of 0.8–3.3 AU once every 2 years and 11 months (1,062 days; semi-major axis of 2.04 AU). Its orbit has an eccentricity of 0.61 and an inclination of 8° with respect to the ecliptic.

The asteroid also approached Mars on 11 May 2018.

A generic magnitude-to-diameter conversion gives a mean-diameter of 13–27 meters, for an absolute magnitude of 26.6, and an assumed albedo between 0.25 and 0.057, which typically correspond to the composition of a stony and carbonaceous body, respectively.

References

External links
 
 
 

Minor planet object articles (unnumbered)
20171215